This is a list of the 72 Members of Parliament (MPs) elected to the House of Commons of the United Kingdom by Scottish constituencies for the Fifty-Second Parliament of the United Kingdom (1997 to 2001) at the 1997 United Kingdom general election.

Composition

List

By-elections 

 1997 Paisley South By-election, Douglas Alexander, Labour
 1999 Hamilton South By-election, Bill Tynan, Labour
 2000 Glasgow Anniesland By-election, John Robertson, Labour
 2000 Falkirk West By-election, Eric Joyce, Labour

See also 

 Lists of MPs for constituencies in Scotland

Lists of UK MPs 1997–2001
Lists of MPs for constituencies in Scotland
1997 United Kingdom general election